Nassif Zeytoun (born September 25, 1988) is a Syrian singer and the 2010 winner of the Arabic reality television show Star Academy. He is best known for his song "Mesh Aam Tezbat Maae", released in 2014. His music videos on YouTube have millions of views. His album Toul Al Yom was released in July 2016 and instantly reached the top of charts in the Arab world. One of the tracks from the album, "Bi Rabbek", had been No. 1 on the music app Anghami. He is also a member of the Syrian Christian community.

In 2016, Zeytoun took part in Stars On Board, a televised cruise with celebrity guests from many parts of the Arab world, and has held several concerts in Syria and Lebanon. Zeytoun's love for his country inspired the song "Haweety", in which the singer pays tribute to his war-torn country.

Career
In 2010, Zeytoun was the first Syrian to ever enter the final and win Star Academy Arab World;  he received 65.21% of the final votes cast by viewers.

Zeytoun has also participated in Tomorrow/Bokra, a charity event produced by Quincy Jones and advertised by Shakira along with 23 other major Arab artists.

Discography

Albums

Ya Samt (2013)

Toul Al Yom (2016)

Enti W Ana (2021)

Singles

Remixes

References

Living people
21st-century Syrian male singers
People from Damascus
Syrian Christians
1988 births